Eumetula arctica is a species of sea snail, a gastropod in the family Newtoniellidae, which is known from the northwestern Atlantic Ocean, European waters, including the Mediterranean Sea, and the Gulf of Maine. It was described by Mørch, in 1857.

Description 
The maximum recorded shell length is 11 mm.

Habitat 
Minimum recorded depth is 60 m. Maximum recorded depth is 1010 m.

References

Newtoniellidae
Gastropods described in 1857